The Cassirer–Heidegger debate was an encounter between the philosophers Martin Heidegger and Ernst Cassirer from March 17 to April 6, 1929 during the Second Davos Hochschulkurs (Davos University Conference) which held its opening session in the Hotel Belvédère in Davos on 17 March 1929. Cassirer gave four lectures and Heidegger gave three lectures. The debate was about the significance of Kantian notions of freedom and rationality.

Cassirer argues that while Kant's Critique of Pure Reason emphasizes human temporality and finitude, he also sought to situate human cognition within a broader conception of humanity. Cassirer challenges Heidegger's relativism by invoking the universal validity of truths discovered by the exact and moral sciences. After this series of debates, Heidegger wrote Kant und das Problem der Metaphysik (1929), perhaps in response to this encounter with Cassirer.

In Continental Divide: Heidegger, Cassirer, Davos (Harvard University Press, 2010), Peter E. Gordon reconstructs the debate between Heidegger and Cassirer, demonstrating its significance as a point of rupture in Continental thought that implicated all the major philosophical movements of the day. Continental Divide was awarded the Jacques Barzun Prize from the American Philosophical Society in 2010.

Rudolf Carnap and Joseph B. Soloveitchik were also in the audience at Davos.

See also 

 
 Foucault–Habermas debate
 Gadamer–Derrida debate
 Hart–Dworkin debate
 Hart–Fuller debate
 Positivism dispute
 Second Conference on the Epistemology of the Exact Sciences
 Searle–Derrida debate

Notes

References 
 Otto Friedrich Bollnow and Joachim Ritter, "Davoser Disputation zwischen Ernst Cassirer und Martin Heidegger" (transcription: March 25, 1929), in Martin Heidegger, Kant und das Problem der Metaphysik, 5th ed., Vittorio Klostermann, 1991, Appendix IV, pp. 274–96. In English as "Davos Disputation Between Ernst Cassirer and Martin Heidegger," in Kant and the Problem of Metaphysics, 4th ed., Indiana University Press, 1990, pp. 171–85.
 Michael Friedman, A Parting of the Ways: Carnap, Cassirer, and Heidegger (Open Court, 2011 [2000]).

Further reading
 

1929 in Switzerland
Continental philosophy
Ernst Cassirer
Martin Heidegger
Philosophical debates